John O'Keeffe (born 15 April 1951 in Tralee, County Kerry) is a former Irish Gaelic footballer who played for the Austin Stacks club and at senior level for the Kerry county team between 1969 and 1984. He was a highly talented midfielder, and one of the most stylish and accomplished full-backs in Gaelic football history. He later became the Irish international rules team manager.

Career highlights
O'Keeffe's father Frank also played for Kerry.

O'Keeffe won seven All-Ireland Senior Football Championship medals and 12 Munster Championship medals. Other honours he won include seven National Football League medals and eight Railway Cup medals between Munster and the Combined Universities. He also won a Munster Junior Championship medal in 1969.

He is among the leading recipients of GAA All Stars Awards, with five awards from 1973, 1975, 1976, 1978, and 1979.  He was also named the Texaco Footballer of the Year in 1975.

O'Keeffe retired reluctantly on medical advice after the 1984 Munster Final with a serious hip complaint, having played relatively few games in the previous 18 months. He had hip replacement surgery some 20 years later. His last game for Kerry was in the full back position against Tipperary in the 1984 Munster  semi-final. O'Keeffe has always maintained that probably his most dangerous opponent was Dublin's Jimmy Keaveney, with whom he enjoyed several battles. His performance against Offaly's Matt Connor in the 1982 All-Ireland final was all the more remarkable considering he had little or no training preparation owing to injury. O'Keeffe is consistently named as full back in various GAA players/managers best ever team selections, particularly in the years leading up to the GAA's Centenary and beyond.

He was captain of the Austin Stacks team that won the 1976 County Senior Football Championship, he also won medals in 1973, 1974, 1979 and 1986 (following a brief comeback), as well as a Munster Club Championship in 1976 and an All-Ireland in 1977. He also won a County Minor Hurling Championship with the club in 1967.

He was part of the St Brendan's Killarney side that won the school's first Hogan Cup title in 1969.

With the UCD GAA team, he won a Dublin County Championship in 1974, and the Leinster Club Championships and All-Ireland Club Championships in 1973-74 and 1974-75. He also won Sigerson Cup medals in 1973, 1974, and 1975.

In May 2020, the Irish Independent named O'Keeffe at number ten in its "Top 20 footballers in Ireland over the past 50 years".

References

1951 births
Living people
All Stars Awards winners (football)
Alumni of University College Dublin
Austin Stacks Gaelic footballers
Austin Stacks hurlers
Dual players
Gaelic football backs
Ireland international rules football team coaches
Irish schoolteachers
Kerry inter-county Gaelic footballers
Munster inter-provincial Gaelic footballers
Texaco Footballers of the Year
UCD Gaelic footballers
Winners of six All-Ireland medals (Gaelic football)